Kees Klop (18 December 1947 in The Hague – 31 August 2007 in The Hague) was a Dutch professor of political ethics at Radboud University Nijmegen.  Kees Klop served as the chairman of the NCRV from 2001 to 2005.  He also worked as a columnist for the Trouw.

References

External links
NCRV press release concerning Kees Klop's death 
CDA Kees Klop story 

1947 births
2007 deaths
Dutch public administration scholars
Dutch public broadcasting administrators
Dutch columnists
Writers from The Hague
Academic staff of Radboud University Nijmegen